Red Sea is the second and last album by English hard rock band  Warhorse. The band is most known for its bass player, who was the original bassist of Deep Purple ("Mark 1") from 1968 to 1969 for the first three albums.

Background 

The CD reissue on the Angel Air label has six previously unreleased bonus tracks, including a live version of "Ritual" (from the first Warhorse album) and five demos all written by bassist Simper which did not appear on any record before.

Richtie Unterberger claims, the album was "basically more of the same prog rock-proto metal". Except the song Confident But Wrong being  more mainstream rock sounding or the soul based I (Who Have Nothing). Singer Ashley Holts performance was not praised as he was "tending to hit more annoying high notes". Back in Time was mentioned for its "unconscious models for the kind of singing" which was parodied by Spinal Tap.

Track listing 
All songs written by Warhorse, except where noted.

Red Sea 4:20
Back in Time 7:49 	
Confident But Wrong 4:46 	
Feeling Better 5:33 	
Sybilla 5:33 	
Mouthpiece 8:43 	
I (Who Have Nothing) (Carlo Donida / Jerry Leiber / Mike Stoller) 5:16

CD re-issue tracks 
Bad Time (Nick Simper) 4:40 
She Was My Friend (Simper) 4:55
Gypsy Dancer (Simper) 4:08
House of Dolls (Simper) 4:19 	
Standing Right Behind You 4:35

Personnel 
 Ashley Holt – vocals
 Ged Peck – guitar
 Nick Simper – bass
 Frank Wilson – keyboards, organ, piano 
 Mac Poole – drums

Additional personnel 
 Peter Parks – acoustic guitar

Production 
 Warhorse & Ian Kimmet - Producers
 Rick Breach – photography, sleeve art, sleeve design 
 Dave Stock – engineer 
 Phillip Walker – liner notes
 Nick Watson – remastering (CD reissue)

References

1972 albums
Warhorse (British band) albums
Vertigo Records albums